Edward Leon Everitt (January 12, 1947 – August 27, 2016) was a pitcher in Major League Baseball who made five relief appearances for the San Diego Padres during their inaugural 1969 season. Listed at 6' 1", 195 lb., he batted left handed and threw right handed.

Born in Marshall, Texas, Everitt was selected originally by the Los Angeles Dodgers in the 15th round of the 1965 MLB Draft. He spent four seasons in the Dodgers Minor League Baseball system from 1965 to 1968, before joining the Padres organization in 1969. He went 0-1 with an 8.04 earned run average for San Diego.

Besides, Everitt posted a 44-31 record with a 3.31 ERA in 108 minor league games, including 89 starts, 41 complete games and eight shutouts, striking out 595 batters while walking 305 in 663 innings of work.

After his baseball career, Everitt worked as a taxi driver, insurance salesman and in the construction industry in his homeland of Marshall, Texas, where he died in 2016 at the age of 69.

Sources

1947 births
2016 deaths
African-American baseball players
Albuquerque Dodgers players
Arizona Instructional League Dodgers players
Baseball players from Texas
Jamestown Dodgers players
Key West Padres players
Major League Baseball pitchers
San Diego Padres players
People from Marshall, Texas
Pocatello Chiefs players
Spokane Indians players
American taxi drivers
20th-century African-American sportspeople
21st-century African-American people